Thomas Winterflood (20 July 1832 – 20 February 1900) was an English first-class cricketer.

Winterflood was born at Lambeth in July 1832. He made one appearance in first-class cricket for the Surrey Club against the Marylebone Cricket Club at The Oval in 1866. He wasn't required to bat in the match and bowled five four-ball overs without taking a wicket. He died at Brixton Hill in February 1900.

References

External links

1832 births
1900 deaths
People from Lambeth
English cricketers
Surrey Club cricketers